West Little Owyhee River is a  tributary of the Owyhee River in the U.S. state of Oregon. West Little Owyhee River has a  watershed.

The river begins east of McDermitt and flows east by Deer Flat and into Louse Canyon. Near Twin Buttes, it turns sharply north, still in Louse Canyon, which it follows through the Owyhee Desert all the way to the Owyhee River in Owyhee Canyon. The entire river is protected as part of the National Wild and Scenic Rivers System.

Overseen by the Bureau of Land Management, the river offers fishing for smallmouth bass and trout, and the canyon area is scenic. Dispersed camping is allowed, although the watershed has no developed parks or campsites. Other forms of recreation include hiking, backpacking, hunting, picnicking, and biking.

Named tributaries from source to mouth are Lake Fork West Owyhee River, Jack Creek, Little Spring Creek, and Toppin Creek, which all enter from the right had side bank. Further downstream, Cave Creek enters from the left.

See also 
 List of rivers of Oregon
 List of longest streams of Oregon

References

External links

Owyhee Watershed Council
National Wild and Scenic Rivers System

Rivers of Oregon
Owyhee River
Rivers of Malheur County, Oregon
Wild and Scenic Rivers of the United States